HMS Chaplet was a  destroyer of the Royal Navy that was in service from August 1945, and which was scrapped in 1965.

Construction
The Royal Navy ordered Chaplet on 24 July 1942, one of eight "Ch" subclass "Intermediate" destroyers of the 1942 Programme. She was laid down at the yard of Thornycroft, Woolston on 29 April 1943 and commissioned on 24 August 1945, too late for service in the Second World War.

Service
Chaplet was assigned to the 1st Destroyer Squadron based at Malta in the early 1950s. She was given an interim modernization in 1954, which saw her 'X' turret at the rear of the ship replaced by two Squid anti-submarine mortars. She saw duty during the Suez Crisis in 1956.

On 22 May 1959, Rhyl collided with the Icelandic patrol boat Óðinn when on fishery protection duties. Óðinns lifeboat was destroyed in the collision, which Chaplets commanding officer blamed on a misjudgement by Óðinn, while Óðinns captain claimed that Chaplet had deliberately rammed Óðinn.

Decommissioning and disposal
Chaplet was decommissioned and laid up in 1961.  She was sold for scrapping to Hughes Bolckow and arrived at their yard at Blyth on 6 November 1965.

References

Publications
 
 

 

1944 ships
C-class destroyers (1943) of the Royal Navy
World War II destroyers of the United Kingdom
Cold War destroyers of the United Kingdom
Ships built by John I. Thornycroft & Company